Bloquera is an EP created by Maanumental, Newman, Sir Kado, Superbrush 427 (Giant Panda) and Thes One (People Under The Stairs). The group decided to take a spur of the moment road trip to Mexico as an ultimate road trip. The album was a result of a two-week road trip to Mulegé,  Baja California Sur, Mexico which was the inspiration for the album.

During their stay in Mulegé the group camped on the beach facing the Gulf of California where they fished for their meals, visited local taco stands, purchased produce from local farmers, and attended local baseball. They also filmed their trip using two Super 8 mm film cameras to document the trip. The video was released as a bonus DVD on People Under The Stairs' next album Stepfather.

Tres Records released the album as a 12" LP in limited quantities. The album is still available for purchase on the iTunes Store.

Each member of the group also took on a unique alias for the album which is listed below:

Maanumental as Maanu MyGoose
Newman as Sandy Sand Dollar
Sir Kado as  The Sea Troll
Superbrush 427 as Big Sun
Thes One as The Sassy Warlock

Track listing
Shine On – 4:04
Taller Gomez – 5:03
Tricky Trakes – 1:02
Fiesta – 3:54
Back to the Grind Again – 4:44

Personnel
Maanumental – (Vocals, Video Editing)
Newman – (Vocals)
Sir Kado – (Vocals, DJ, Producer, Video Editing)
Superbrush 427 – (Vocals, DJ, Photos)
Thes One – (Vocals, Producer, DJ, Mixer, Video Editing)
Sausen – (Artwork/Layout)

Giant Panda (group) albums
2004 EPs